Iron Monkey is an English sludge metal band that formed in Nottingham in 1994. The original members were Justin Greaves (drums, ex-Bradworthy), Johnny Morrow (vocals), Jim Rushby (guitar, ex-Ironside, Wartorn), Steve Watson (guitar, ex-Cerebral Fix) and Doug Dalziel (bass, ex-Ironside). The group's sound was influenced by the doom metal and  sludge metal genres and in particular by bands such as Grief, Black Sabbath and Eyehategod.

History 
In 1996, the group wrote a six-song EP that was released on the small imprint Union Mill. It was reissued in 1997 when the band signed to Nottingham label Earache Records. Before the deal was made however guitarist Watson was fired and replaced by Dean Berry. The band's second release Our Problem received high acclaim. In July 1999, the band released a split CD/10" with Japanese doom metal band Church of Misery that was put out by Man's Ruin Records. The same year the band played the Dynamo Festival in the Netherlands and shortly after Jim Rushby left the band and was replaced by ex-Acrimony guitarist Stu O'Hara. Due to a variety of personal and industry problems the band split in September 1999.

Post-split 
Justin, Jim and Johnny went on to form the short-lived Armour of God while Dean, Doug and Stu formed Dukes of Nothing. Steve has played in Cerebral Fix, Drown, Helvis and Raven's Creed. Johnny then formed My War and Murder One before suffering a fatal heart attack in the summer of 2002. Justin has since played in Borknagar, Silver Ginger Five, Hard To Swallow, Teeth of Lions Rule the Divine, Electric Wizard and now plays in Crippled Black Phoenix. Dean played in The Dukes of Nothing and Capricorns, while Stu went on to play in Black Eye Riot. He is now playing with Acrimony members in Sigiriya, a stoner rock band. Jim played in Hard to Swallow, Armour of God, Phantom Limb Management and Geriatric Unit.

Reunion 
Iron Monkey reformed in January 2017 as a trio featuring Watson playing bass, Rushby singing and playing guitar, and new member Scott Briggs. The band wrote and recorded the album 9-13 which was released on Relapse records in October 2017. Scott Briggs was replaced on drums by Steven Mellor aka Ze Big from the band Widows in January 2018.

Members

Current members 
 Jim Rushby – guitar (1994–1999, 2017–present), vocals (2017–present)
 Steve Watson – guitar (1994–1997), bass (2017–present)
 Steven "Ze Big" Mellor – drums (2018–present)

Former members 
 Scott "Brigga" Briggs – drums (2017)
 Justin Greaves – drums (1994–1999)
 Johnny Morrow – vocals (1994–1999, died 2002)
 Doug Dalziel – bass (1994–1999)
 Dean Berry – guitar (1997–1999)
 Stu O'Hara – guitar (1999)

Timeline

Discography 
Iron Monkey (Union Mill, 1996)
Iron Monkey (Earache, 1997) (reissue)
Our Problem (Earache, 1998)
We've Learned Nothing (Man's Ruin, 1999, split CD with Church of Misery and 10")
Ruined by Idiots (Maniac Beast, 2003)
9-13 (Relapse, 2017)

References

External links 

Earache Records

English doom metal musical groups
Sludge metal musical groups
Musical groups established in 1994
Musical groups disestablished in 1999
Musical groups reestablished in 2017
Earache Records artists
Musical quintets
1994 establishments in England
Musical groups from Nottingham
British crust and d-beat groups